Des barbelés sur la prairie is a Lucky Luke comic written by Goscinny and illustrated by Morris. It was originally published in French by Dupuis in 1967. English editions titled Barbed wire on the Prairie were published by Cinebook Ltd in 2007.

Plot
Lucky Luke involves himself in a quarrel between peaceful farmers and unscrupulous (and fattened-up) ranchers led by Cass Casey who indiscriminately drive their cattle right across the farmers' crops in search of new pastures. The only way the farmers can see to stop this continual rampage is to use the titular material to fence off and protect their land: barbed wire. With the assistance of Lucky Luke, both sides eventually come to realize that without greens there can be no meat, and the matter is settled in the usual happy-end manner.

Characters 

 Vernon and Annabelle Phelps: Farmers who own land on the prairie.
 Cass Casey: A rancher.

References
 Morris publications in Spirou BDoubliées

External links
 Lucky Luke official site album index 
 Goscinny website on Lucky Luke

Comics by Morris (cartoonist)
Lucky Luke albums
1967 graphic novels
Works originally published in Spirou (magazine)
Works by René Goscinny